Saint-Benjamin is a municipality in Les Etchemins Regional County Municipality in Quebec, Canada. It is part of the Chaudière-Appalaches region and the population is 1,090 as of the Canada 2021 Census. It is named in tribute to Reverend Benjamin Demers, promoter of the new parish in 1895.

The Caron twins grew up in Saint-Benjamin.

History
Originally, the territory were Saint-Benjamin is located was known as Saint-François-de-la-Beauce. The boundaries were roughly similar of those of the current city of Beauceville. In 1855, From those boundaries emerged the Parish of Saint-François from witch Saint-Benjamin spitted away in 1897.

References

Commission de toponymie du Québec
Ministère des Affaires municipales, des Régions et de l'Occupation du territoire

Municipalities in Quebec
Incorporated places in Chaudière-Appalaches